The Praga BH-44 (designated E-44 by the Czechoslovak Air Force) was a prototype Czechoslovak fighter biplane of the early 1930s. Only two were built, the rival Avia B-34 being ordered instead.

Design and development

In 1932, ČKD-Praga, the aircraft department of the Czechoslovak company Praga, entered a competition to design a new fighter for the Czechoslovak Air Force, with its design, the BH-44, competing against designs from Avia (the B-34) and Letov (the Š-231). The BH-44 was a single-bay biplane of mixed construction, with wooden wings and a fabric covered, steel-tube fuselage. Powerplant was a single Praga ESV water-cooled V12 engine.

The first prototype made its maiden flight on 19 July 1932. Performance was unimpressive, as the engine delivered only  instead of the promised . A second prototype (sometimes called the EH-144), fitted with a supercharged Praga ESVK engine, flew in April 1934, but performance remained disappointing. The first prototype was therefore re-engined with a  Rolls-Royce Kestrel VII, flying in this form on 30 October 1934, and as such was evaluated by the Czechoslovak Air Force as the E-44. The imported Kestrel engine worked poorly with the fuel used by the Air Force, however, and the type was rejected, the B-34 being purchased instead.

Specifications (ESV engine, performance estimated)

See also

Notes

References

Green, William and Gordon Swanborough. The Complete Book of Fighters. New York: Smithmark, 1994. .

BH-44
1930s Czechoslovakian fighter aircraft
Biplanes
Single-engined tractor aircraft
Aircraft first flown in 1932